Trevithal is a hamlet west of Mousehole, Cornwall, England, United Kingdom.

References

Hamlets in Cornwall